Al-aman (Persian: الامان) (1536 - 1528) was a Mughal prince and the eldest son of the Mughal Emperor Humayun and his first wife and chief consort Bega Begum.

Birth
Al-aman Mirza was born in Badakshan, present-day Afghanistan, and was his father's first child and eldest son. Upon the prince's birth, his grandfather, the Emperor Babur, heavily congratulated Humayun and his wife, but criticized the couple for naming the child 'Al-aman', a name which, according to him, was grammatically incorrect and ominous in its connotation. Babur commemorated the birth of his first grandson both by mentioning it and by preserving his own congratulatory letter to Humayun in his memoir, the Baburnama.

Being the Emperor's eldest son, Al-aman Mirza was the heir-apparent to his father but died in childhood.

References

Mughal princes
Mughal nobility
1528 births
Year of death missing
Royalty and nobility who died as children